Asiago (Venetian: Axiago, Cimbrian: Slege, German: Schlägen ) is a minor township (population roughly 6,500) in the surrounding plateau region (the Altopiano di Asiago or Altopiano dei Sette Comuni, Asiago plateau) in the Province of Vicenza in the Veneto region of Northeastern Italy. It is near the border between the Veneto and Trentino-Alto Adige/Südtirol regions in the foothills of the Alps, approximately equidistant (60 km) from Trento to the west and Vicenza to the south. The Asiago region is the origin of Asiago cheese.  The town was the site of a major battle between Austrian and Italian forces on the Alpine Front of World War I.  It is a major ski resort destination, and the site of the Astrophysical Observatory of Asiago, operated by the University of Padua.

Geography

Climate

Culture

Until the middle of the nineteenth century many of the people of Asiago spoke Cimbrian, an ancient German dialect.

Asiago is the birthplace of author Mario Rigoni Stern, and features prominently in his stories.  It is also described in Emilio Lussu's A Year on the Altopiano.

Battle of Asiago

The Battle of Asiago (Battle of the Plateaux) was a counter-offensive launched by the Austro-Hungarians on the Italian Front in May 1916, during World War I. It was an unexpected attack that occurred near Asiago (now in northeast Italy, then on the Italian side of the border between the Kingdom of Italy and Austria-Hungary). Commemorating this battle and the fallen soldiers of World War I is the Asiago War Memorial, a monument and museum that is a popular site for visitors to the area.

Ernest Hemingway fought here. In a later engagement in 1918, Edward Brittain, brother of Vera Brittain, was killed and was buried in the Granezza British military cemetery on the plateau. In 1970 Vera's ashes were scattered on his grave.

The Barenthal, Boscon, Granezza, Magnaboschi and Cavalletto Military Cemeteries at Asiago were designed by Sir Robert Lorimer in 1920.

Sport
The city is home to HC Asiago, a professional ice hockey team currently playing in the international Alps Hockey League as well as in the Italian top tier Serie A.

The Asiago Vipers, based in Asiago, are a professional inline hockey team. The team plays in the highest Italian inline league.

 Enrico Fabris, long track speed skater who has won three World Cup races.
 Ivan Lunardi, one of the best Italian ski jumpers in history.
 Aldo Stella, ski mountaineer and cross-country skier.
 Lucio Topatigh, Italian ice hockey legend.
 Nicola Tumolero, European champion speed skater.

The Asiago Award
The Asiago Award is known as the Oscar of the Philatelic World. Since 1970 the "Circolo Filatelico Numismatico Sette Comuni Asiago" (Numismatic and Philatelic Chapter of the Seven Asiago Communities) has been awarding the prize for the best designed postage stamp of the year.

Sister cities 
 Noventa Vicentina
 Lockport, Illinois

See also 
 Sette Comuni

References

External links 

 Official site 
 Asiago plateau 
 Asiago7Comuni news and general information 
 General information  
 Battle of Asiago  
 Astrophysical Observatory of Asiago  
 Asiago on The Campanile Project
 47th Asiago International Prize for Philatelic Art  

Geography of Veneto